Pseudosesia isozona is a moth of the family Sesiidae. It is found in Queensland, Australia.

The length of the forewings is 10–11 mm for males and about 11 mm for females.

This species (at least superficially) resembles Pseudosesia oberthuri. If the two species are closely related, Pseudosesia isozona may be found to be a borer in some species of native vine as well as Pseudosesia oberthuri.

External links
Australian Faunal Directory
Image at CSIRO Entomology
Classification of the Superfamily Sesioidea (Lepidoptera: Ditrysia)
New records and a revised checklist of the Australian clearwing moths (Lepidoptera: Sesiidae)

Moths of Australia
Sesiidae
Moths described in 1886